Roberts Chapel may refer to:

Roberts Chapel (Atlanta, Indiana)
Roberts Chapel United Methodist Church